Paul Stewart may refer to:

Paul Stewart (actor) (1908–1986), American actor who appeared in Citizen Kane
Paul Stewart (Australian footballer) (born 1987), Australian rules footballer 
Paul Stewart (basketball) (born 1956), Scottish international basketball player
Paul Stewart (footballer, born 1964), English international football player (Blackpool, Tottenham Hotspur, Liverpool)
Paul Stewart (footballer, born 1979), Scottish football player (East Fife)
Paul Stewart (historian) (1925–2015), American historian
Paul Stewart (ice hockey) (born 1953), American ice hockey referee and player
Paul Stewart (musician), member of band The Feeling
Paul Stewart (music producer), American music industry producer
Paul Stewart (pianist), Canadian musician
Paul Stewart (politician) (1892–1950), U.S Representative from Oklahoma
Paul Stewart (racing driver) (born 1965), Scottish motor racing driver/team director, son of World Champion Jackie
Paul Stewart (writer) (born 1955), writer of The Edge Chronicles
Paul A. G. Stewart (born 1941), bishop of the Christian Methodist Episcopal Church 
Paul Anthony Stewart, American actor
Paul Stewart (endocrinologist) (born 1959), British medical scientist and endocrinologist

See also
Paul Stuart, American clothier